Cathy Woan-Shu Chen is a Taiwanese statistician, who works as a distinguished professor of statistics at Feng Chia University
and is editor-in-chief of the Journal of Economics and Management.
In 2016, she was elected as a Fellow of the American Statistical Association. Her research interests include Bayesian methods and economic statistics.  In 2020, she was elected as a Fellow of the International Society for Bayesian Analysis.

Chen earned a master's degree at the University of California, Riverside,
and completed her Ph.D. at National Central University.
She joined Feng Chia in 1993, and has been distinguished professor there since 2004. She has also held an adjunct position in the Faculty of Economics at Chiang Mai University since 2007.
At Feng Chia, she directed an international degree program in business analytics, the SJSU-FCU Dual Degree Bachelor's Program in Business Analytics, in conjunction with San Jose State University (2016-2018). She was associate dean of International School Technology & Management, Feng Chia University (2018-2020). She has served as co-editor for Computational Statistics since January 2021.

Chen is also a Fellow of the Royal Statistical Society (elected 2009), and an elected member of the International Statistical Institute (elected 2008).

References

External links
Home page

Year of birth missing (living people)
Living people
Taiwanese statisticians
Women statisticians
University of California, Riverside alumni
National Central University alumni
Cathy Woan-Shu Chen
Elected Members of the International Statistical Institute
Fellows of the American Statistical Association
Fellows of the Royal Statistical Society
Academic staff of Feng Chia University